Kirklinton is a village in the Carlisle district, in the English county of Cumbria. The population of the civil parish of Kirklinton Middle, taken at the 2011 census was 384.  It is a few miles away from the large village of Longtown. It has a church called St Cuthbert's Church. The parish contains the village of Smithfield.

The village lies near the boundary between the civil parishes of Kirklinton Middle and Hethersgill, so that while the church is in the former the adjacent vicarage is in the latter.

Two miles north of the village, Brackenhill Tower is a restored pele tower, built in 1584 and little altered  externally.

The Grade II listed Kirklinton Hall outside the village has been a ruin which lay derelict for 40 years. Since being bought by the Bolye family in 2012, it has been in the process of being renovated. An advertisement for the hall before its decay is shown on the left.

See also

Listed buildings in Hethersgill
Listed buildings in Kirklinton Middle

References

External links

  Cumbria County History Trust: Kirklinton (nb: provisional research only - see Talk page)
 Visit Cumbria

Villages in Cumbria
City of Carlisle